David Lee Jaco (born January 24, 1954) is a retired heavyweight boxer. He spent his career as a journeyman, fighting boxers to build up their career records. He retired in 1994 with 24 wins (19 by knockout), 25 losses (18 by knockout), and 1 draw. Although he lost bouts to Mike Tyson, George Foreman, Tommy Morrison, Carl Williams, Tony Tucker, Buster Douglas, Mike Weaver and Oliver McCall, he won bouts against the undefeated Donovan Ruddock, Rick "King Kong" Keller, and many more.

Jaco was once profiled on ABC's Prime Time Live as a "Palooka", or someone who never refused a fight for the money. Jaco later said, "I was a palooka, one of those guys who basically goes in there looking for a big payday. I made thousands when I fought, but I didn't consider myself a palooka. I was a decent fighter."

Professional career
After winning a local amateur Toughman competition, Jaco trained for a year to turn pro. His first fight was on January 6, 1981, and he defeated Vic Wallace by knockout in four rounds. He went on to win his next eleven fights before a 1983 first-round knockout defeat at the hands of future title contender Carl "The Truth" Williams.

Jaco continued to fight journeymen like himself for the next several months and won five more fights before his next defeat, a unanimous decision against Carlos Hernandez. Jaco was dominated in that fight, losing all ten rounds on one judge's scorecard, eight on a second, and seven on a third.

Jaco's first high-profile victory came against a young Canadian fighter and future title contender Donovan Ruddock, whom he beat on April 30, 1985 under controversial circumstances when Ruddock's corner threw in the towel in the eighth round. According to the media, Ruddock later was found to have a respiratory illness that almost ended his career, which may have contributed to breathing problems that caused his corner to stop the fight. Regardless, Jaco won the fight and gained more publicity to further promote himself to fight big time opponents.

The victory over Ruddock was the last Jaco would see until 1988 as he was beaten in his next nine fights, seven times by knockout. Among the fighters he took on were contender José Ribalta, future titleholders Tony Tucker, Buster Douglas, and Mike Tyson, and former champion Mike Weaver.

Jaco's losing streak was finally broken on March 11, 1988, when he knocked out previously unbeaten Zambian Michael Simuwelu in the first round. Again, it would be his last victory for an extended period. Six defeats followed, including fights against future champion Oliver McCall, an on-the-comeback trail George Foreman, and Tommy Morrison.

After his loss to Morrison Jaco went unbeaten in his next five fights, winning four times and drawing against former contender David Bey. After defeating Danny Sutton in the last of those five fights, Jaco never won again. His retirement fight resulted in him getting knocked out by Bey.

Former manager Richard Conti said "David fought on guts. That was his biggest strength. He was never the quickest or the strongest fighter. He took a lot of beatings, but he always gave everything he ever had."

Personal life
Jaco was born in Oregon, Ohio, and grew up in Toledo where he worked at Interlaken Steel after graduating from Clay High School. He was laid off in 1979, to earn money for his wife and two young sons he entered into an amateur "Toughman" competition. He was so successful that he quickly turned pro and won every fight until his first loss to Carl "The Truth" Williams in June 1983.

In 1986, Jaco used the money he made fighting Tyson to move to Florida where his twin boys lived from his first marriage. He remarried and had an additional four daughters: Kaleigh, Brittany, Madison, and Sydney—all of whom grew up to be athletes. Today he is an independent contractor, transporting workers' compensation recipients to their doctor appointments. He published a memoir of his boxing experiences titled Spontaneous Palooka and Mr. Mom (2012).

Jaco's two sons also boxed. His son Aaron runs a boxing gym in Sarasota, Florida; Aaron's first appearance on ESPN was in a fight against Hilario Guzman in 2004.

In 2003, it was reported that Jaco ran a youth boxing program at the Manatee County Police Athletic League. In October 2005, Jaco was fired from the position after he was arrested in a McDonald's parking lot for possessing 30 grams of marijuana. Jaco said "I know the harm in taking medication in pills and painkillers, so I took to smoking marijuana to ease my pain and help me sleep at night." The program head Michael Polin said Jaco was an "excellent" boxing instructor.

Professional boxing record

|-
|align="center" colspan=8|24 Wins (19 knockouts, 5 decisions), 25 Losses (18 knockouts, 7 decisions), 1 Draw  
|
|-
| align="center" style="border-style: none none solid solid; background: #e3e3e3"|Result
| align="center" style="border-style: none none solid solid; background: #e3e3e3"|Record
| align="center" style="border-style: none none solid solid; background: #e3e3e3"|Opponent
| align="center" style="border-style: none none solid solid; background: #e3e3e3"|Type
| align="center" style="border-style: none none solid solid; background: #e3e3e3"|Round
| align="center" style="border-style: none none solid solid; background: #e3e3e3"|Date
| align="center" style="border-style: none none solid solid; background: #e3e3e3"|Location
| align="center" style="border-style: none none solid solid; background: #e3e3e3"|Notes
|-align=left
|Loss
|
|align=left| David Bey
|TKO
|8
|17/09/1994
|align=left| Macao, China
|align=left|
|-
|Loss
|
|align=left| Adilson Rodrigues
|UD
|10
|31/07/1993
|align=left| Sao Paulo, Brazil
|align=left|
|-
|Loss
|
|align=left| Melton Bowen
|TKO
|2
|29/01/1993
|align=left| Columbia, South Carolina, U.S.
|align=left|
|-
|Loss
|
|align=left| Bert Cooper
|UD
|10
|11/07/1992
|align=left| Fort Myers, Florida, U.S.
|align=left|
|-
|Loss
|24–21–1
|align=left| Alexander Zolkin
|PTS
|10
|12/06/1992
|align=left| Columbus, Ohio, U.S.
|align=left|
|-
|Loss
|24–20–1
|align=left| Magne Havnå
|TKO
|4
|14/03/1992
|align=left| Copenhagen, Denmark
|align=left|
|-
|Loss
|24–19–1
|align=left| Mike Hunter
|TKO
|3
|14/02/1992
|align=left| Las Vegas, Nevada, U.S.
|align=left|
|-
|Win
|24–18–1
|align=left| Danny Sutton
|TKO
|3
|16/10/1991
|align=left| Bradenton, Florida, U.S.
|align=left|
|-
|Draw
|23–18–1
|align=left| David Bey
|PTS
|10
|07/09/1991
|align=left| Sarasota, Florida, U.S.
|align=left|
|-
|Win
|23–18
|align=left| Haakan Brock
|SD
|6
|11/06/1991
|align=left| Miami Beach, Florida, U.S.
|align=left|
|-
|Win
|22–18
|align=left| Greg Payne
|TKO
|2
|11/05/1991
|align=left| Orlando, Florida, U.S.
|align=left|
|-
|Win
|21–18
|align=left| Frankie Hines
|TKO
|4
|20/10/1990
|align=left| Charleston, South Carolina, U.S.
|align=left|
|-
|Loss
|20–18
|align=left| Tommy Morrison
|KO
|1
|19/09/1989
|align=left| Jacksonville, Florida, U.S.
|align=left|
|-
|Loss
|20–17
|align=left| Alex Stewart
|TKO
|1
|18/02/1989
|align=left| Budapest, Hungary
|align=left|
|-
|Loss
|20–16
|align=left| George Foreman
|TKO
|1
|28/12/1988
|align=left| Bakersfield, California, U.S.
|align=left|
|-
|Loss
|20–15
|align=left| Gary Mason
|TKO
|4
|24/10/1988
|align=left| Windsor, England
|align=left|
|-
|Loss
|20–14
|align=left| Oliver McCall
|UD
|10
|30/06/1988
|align=left| Virginia Beach, Virginia, U.S.
|align=left|
|-
|Loss
|20–13
|align=left| Mike Ronay Evans
|TKO
|9
|21/05/1988
|align=left| Gary, Indiana, U.S.
|align=left|
|-
|Win
|20–12
|align=left| Michael Simuwelu
|KO
|1
|11/03/1988
|align=left| Düsseldorf, Germany
|align=left|
|-
|Loss
|19–12
|align=left| Phil Brown
|UD
|10
|20/02/1988
|align=left| Trumbull, Connecticut, U.S.
|align=left|
|-
|Loss
|19–11
|align=left| Mike Weaver
|KO
|2
|29/07/1987
|align=left| Yaoundé, Cameroon
|align=left|
|-
|Loss
|19–10
|align=left| Johnny Du Plooy
|KO
|2
|22/11/1986
|align=left| Johannesburg, South Africa
|align=left|
|-
|Loss
|19–9
|align=left| Elijah Tillery
|KO
|9
|11/07/1986
|align=left| Swan Lake, New York, U.S.
|align=left|
|-
|Loss
|19–8
|align=left| Jose Ribalta
|KO
|5
|13/05/1986
|align=left| Bloomington, Minnesota, U.S.
|align=left|
|-
|Loss
|19–7
|align=left| Buster Douglas
|UD
|8
|19/04/1986
|align=left| Las Vegas, Nevada, U.S.
|align=left|
|-
|Loss
|19–6
|align=left| Mike Tyson
|TKO
|1
|11/01/1986
|align=left| Albany, New York, U.S.
|align=left|
|-
|Loss
|19–5
|align=left| Tony Tucker
|TKO
|3
|19/10/1985
|align=left| Monte Carlo, Monaco
|align=left|
|-
|Loss
|19–4
|align=left| Pierre Coetzer
|KO
|6
|08/07/1985
|align=left| Johannesburg, South Africa
|align=left|
|-
|Win
|19–3
|align=left| Donovan Ruddock
|TKO
|8
|30/04/1985
|align=left| Dartmouth, Nova Scotia, Canada
|align=left|
|-
|Loss
|18–3
|align=left| Dion Simpson
|TKO
|3
|09/02/1985
|align=left| Port Huron, Michigan, U.S.
|align=left|
|-
|Win
|18–2
|align=left| Rick Kellar
|KO
|3
|09/01/1985
|align=left| Saginaw, Michigan, U.S.
|align=left|
|-
|Loss
|17–2
|align=left| Carlos Hernandez
|UD
|10
|14/11/1984
|align=left| New York City, New York, U.S.
|align=left|
|-
|Win
|17–1
|align=left| Cornelius Benson
|UD
|8
|24/10/1984
|align=left| Saginaw, Michigan, U.S.
|align=left|
|-
|Win
|16–1
|align=left| Ken Penn
|KO
|1
|21/09/1984
|align=left| Tulsa, Oklahoma, U.S.
|align=left|
|-
|Win
|15–1
|align=left| Ron Draper
|KO
|3
|14/09/1984
|align=left| Iowa, U.S.
|align=left|
|-
|Win
|14–1
|align=left|Larry Landers
|KO
|4
|27/07/1984
|align=left| Macon, Georgia, U.S.
|align=left|
|-
|Win
|13–1
|align=left| Rick Keller
|PTS
|8
|23/06/1984
|align=left| Dubuque, Iowa, U.S.
|align=left|
|-
|Loss
|12–1
|align=left| Carl Williams
|TKO
|1
|30/06/1983
|align=left| Atlantic City, New Jersey, U.S.
|align=left|
|-
|Win
|12–0
|align=left| Melvin Hosey
|TKO
|4
|16/04/1983
|align=left| Toledo, Ohio, U.S.
|align=left|
|-
|Win
|11–0
|align=left| Jeff Burg
|TKO
|1
|05/03/1983
|align=left| Bay City, Michigan, U.S.
|align=left|
|-
|Win
|10–0
|align=left| David Starkey
|TKO
|3
|12/02/1983
|align=left| Lima, Ohio, U.S.
|align=left|
|-
|Win
|9–0
|align=left| Vernon Bridges
|PTS
|8
|19/08/1982
|align=left| Bay City, Michigan, U.S.
|align=left|
|-
|Win
|8–0
|align=left| Harold Johnson
|KO
|2
|17/04/1982
|align=left| Dayton, Ohio, U.S.
|align=left|
|-
|Win
|7–0
|align=left| Harold Speakman
|KO
|3
|08/12/1981
|align=left| Columbus, Ohio, U.S.
|align=left|
|-
|Win
|6–0
|align=left|Doug Meiring
|KO
|3
|09/10/1981
|align=left| Toledo, Ohio, U.S.
|align=left|
|-
|Win
|5–0
|align=left|Otis Evans
|KO
|2
|08/08/1981
|align=left| Pensacola, Florida, U.S.
|align=left|
|-
|Win
|4–0
|align=left| Vernon Bridges
|PTS
|6
|29/07/1981
|align=left| Saginaw, Michigan, U.S.
|align=left|
|-
|Win
|3–0
|align=left| Stanley Dollison
|KO
|1
|20/06/1981
|align=left| Findlay, Ohio, U.S.
|align=left|
|-
|Win
|2–0
|align=left| Hubert Adams
|KO
|1
|13/02/1981
|align=left| Lima, Ohio, U.S.
|align=left|
|-
|Win
|1–0
|align=left| Vic Wallace
|KO
|4
|06/01/1981
|align=left| Pontiac, Michigan, U.S.
|align=left|
|}

References

External links 
 

1954 births
American male boxers
Boxers from Ohio
Heavyweight boxers
Living people
People from Oregon, Ohio
Sportspeople from Toledo, Ohio